Scelodonta viridula is a species of leaf beetle of West Africa and the Democratic Republic of the Congo. It was first described from Old Calabar, now in Nigeria, by Édouard Lefèvre in 1875.

References

Eumolpinae
Beetles of the Democratic Republic of the Congo
Beetles described in 1875
Taxa named by Édouard Lefèvre
Insects of West Africa